Kalam Vellum is a 1970 Indian Tamil-language Western film produced, filmed and directed by M. Karnan. The film stars Jaishankar, Vijayakumari and Vijaya Lalitha. It revolves around a farmer who, in his quest to avenge his sister's death, becomes a dacoit bent on revenge. The film was released on 11 September 1970.

Plot 

Velu, a poor farmer, loses his sister Dhanam due to the atrocities and exploitation of landlord Periyaraja. To avenge his sister's death, Velu kills Periyaraja's brother Chinnaraja. He then escapes from there. He joins a gang of dacoits, headed by Narasingam. The gang is initially perturbed by Velu's presence, but his courage and good nature wins him their love and respect. Velu succeeds Narasingam as the gang leader. His aim is to rob the rich and save the poor. He is constantly looking for an opportunity to take revenge against Periyasamy. Velu forgets that his wife is waiting for his return to his village. Finally, Velu takes revenge on Periyaraja and surrenders to the police.

Cast 
 Jaishankar as Velu
 Vijayakumari as Kannamma
 Nagesh as Paavadai
 O. A. K. Thevar as Periyaraja
 M. R. R. Vasu as Chinnaraja
 Vijaya Lalitha as Rani
 Ganthimathi as Velu's mother
 Usha as Dhanam
 Shanmugasundaram as Narasingam
 V. Nagayya as a police officer

Production 
In January 1970, several months after the release of his first film as a producer (Pennai Vazha Vidungal, August 1969), M. Karnan began pre-production on his directorial debut, Kalam Vellum.

Soundtrack 
The soundtrack was composed by Shankar–Ganesh, with lyrics by Kannadasan.

Release and reception 
Kalam Vellum was released on 11 September 1970. The Indian Express called it a "hotchpotch of all the adventure films that have come in Tamil and English movies that have been imported".

References

Bibliography

External links 
 

1970 directorial debut films
1970 films
1970s Tamil-language films
1970 Western (genre) films
Films directed by M. Karnan
Films scored by Shankar–Ganesh
Indian films about revenge
Indian Western (genre) films